Matt's Place Drive-In in Butte, Montana is one of the first drive-in restaurants in Montana. Unlike later drive-ins, which frequently featured a streamline moderne style, or at least an acknowledgement of their orientation to automobile-oriented customers, Matt's Place was a straightforward conversion of a house to serve customers in cars.  Established in 1930, its chief concession to the automobile is a tall curb to keep parking cars from hitting the building and a menu on the outside of the building, advertising curb service.  The interior retains its 1936 counter and 1950s lighting fixtures.

They were awarded the 2016 James Beard Foundation America's Classic Award.

See also
 List of drive-in restaurants

References

External links

Montana State Preservation Office: Matt's Place with image

Commercial buildings on the National Register of Historic Places in Montana
Drive-in restaurants
Buildings and structures in Butte, Montana
Restaurants in Montana
Restaurants established in 1930
1930 establishments in Montana
Tourist attractions in Butte, Montana
National Register of Historic Places in Silver Bow County, Montana
Restaurants on the National Register of Historic Places
James Beard Foundation Award winners